Haslochbach is a small river of Bavaria, Germany. It flows into the Main east of Hasloch.

Course
The Hasellochbach rises at the Haselbrunnen in the upper Haseltal, at the foot of the Geiersberg, the highest elevation of the Spessart.

It then becomes the border between the districts of Miltenberg and Main-Spessart and gradually turns more to the southeast.

It flows past the village of Schollbrunn, which is located on the hill to the south. Beginning at the Zwieselsmühle (water mill) the valley of the Haslochbach is called Mühlental and the  flows into the Haslochbach from the north. The brook then passes the Nickelsmühle and the Fechermühle near the ruin of the medieval . This marks the end of the Mühlental.

The Haslochbach then flows south past the Barthelsmühle, parallel to the road ST2316, and into the Main, east of Hasloch.

See also
List of rivers of Bavaria

References

External links

Rivers of Bavaria
Rivers of the Spessart
Rivers of Germany